Hydroids are a life stage for most animals of the class Hydrozoa, small predators related to jellyfish. 

Some hydroids such as the freshwater Hydra are solitary, with the polyp attached directly to the substrate. When these produce buds, they become detached and grow on as new individuals.

The majority of hydroids are colonial. The original polyp is anchored to a solid substrate and forms a bud which remains attached to its parent. This in turn buds and in this way a stem is formed. The arrangement of polyps and the branching of the stem is characteristic of the species.

Some species have the polyps budding directly off the stolon which roots the colony. The polyps are connected by epidermis which surrounds a gastrovascular cavity. The epidermis secretes a chitinous skeleton which supports the stem and in some hydroids, the skeleton extends into a cup shape surrounding the polyp.

Most of the polyps are gastrozooids or feeding polyps, but some are specialised reproductive structures known as gonozooids. In some species, further specialised zooids are formed.

References

Zoology
Hydrozoa